Thomas Gordon Seaton (August 30, 1887 – April 10, 1940) was a pitcher in Major League Baseball from 1912-1917. He was signed in 1909 as a pitcher by the Portland, Oregon baseball team in the Pacific Coast League. In  he was part of a pitching staff that included Gene Krapp, Jack Graney, Bill Steen and Vean Gregg.

After struggling through a mediocre season in 1912, Seaton became a dominating pitcher in 1913 appearing in 52 games and compiling a 27–12 record in 322.1 innings.  After a dispute involving his wife and the Phillies, Seaton signed with the Brooklyn Tip-Tops of the Federal League.  Seaton went 25–14 that year.  Seaton struggled in 1915.

After the Federal League folded after the 1915 season, Seaton pitched for the Chicago Cubs.  He eventually was released and returned to the Pacific Coast League.

As a hitter, Seaton posted a .186 batting average (84-for-451) with 44 runs, 4 home runs, 32 RBI and 24 bases on balls in 231 games.

He died on April 10, 1940.

See also
 List of Major League Baseball annual strikeout leaders
 List of Major League Baseball annual wins leaders

External links

 SABR Biography
 

1887 births
1940 deaths
People from Blair, Nebraska
Major League Baseball pitchers
Baseball players from Nebraska
Philadelphia Phillies players
Brooklyn Tip-Tops players
Newark Peppers players
Chicago Cubs players
National League strikeout champions
National League wins champions
Portland Beavers players
Portland Colts players
Los Angeles Angels (minor league) players
San Francisco Seals (baseball) players